Keirinjōmae Station is the name of multiple train stations in Japan:

 Keirinjōmae Station (Aichi)
 Keirinjōmae Station (Toyama)
 Kaizuka Station (Fukuoka), called Keirinjōmae Station until 1962